Hopes & Dreams is the debut studio album by Georgia-based rock band Faster Faster, released to stores and digitally in the United States on August 12, 2008. It is their first and only album on Oort Records, following the success of their debut EP, Pillow Talk 101, in 2006.

Track listing
 "I'm Drawn To You Sweetheart" – 3:48
 "Girl Named Gasoline" – 4:00
 "Backstabbing Never Seemed So Friendly" – 4:01
 "They Call It Lust, We Call It A Good Time" – 3:13
 "Matchsticks Don't Make Men" – 3:51
 "Fairytales and Lullabies" – 3:10
 "A Moment in Sheets" – 5:24
 "From My TV Screen To Your Bedroom" – 2:57
 "Forever..." – 2:36
 "...And Always" – 3:05
 "These Are The Days" – 4:36
 "You're Killing Me Smalls" (Japanese Bonus Track) - 3:23

b-sides
 "Set The Stage" – 1:52
 "These Are The Days" (Remix) – 4:34
 "From My TV Screen To Your Bedroom (Demo)

Notes
Music videos were shot for both "I'm Drawn to you Sweetheart" and "From My TV Screen to Your Bedroom"
Due to the fact that Jet Turner from Dora Maar was a featured musician on the album the song "They Call It Lust, We Call It a Good Time" is believed to possibly be a reference to Doraa Maar's song titled "Call it Lust", in return Turner's new band, The Shootout! wrote a song responding called, "They Call It A Good Time, We Call It Date Rape".

Personnel & Credits
Kyle Davis – Vocals
Randall Dowling – Vocals, Guitar, Keys
Christian Mosely – Guitar, Keys
Joey Poppell – Bass Guitar
Trevor Aspinwall – Drums, Percussion
Lee Dyess – Keys, Cello, Programing
Lurch – Upright Bass on "They Call It Lust, We Call It A Good Time"
Jet Turner – Additional Vocals on "...And Always"
All music written by Faster Faster
All lyrics written by Kyle Davis and Randall Dowling except "Girl Named Gasoline", "They Call It Lust, We Call It A Good Time" by Christian Mosely, Kyle Davis, and Randall Dowling
Produced, Recorded, and Mixed by Lee Dyes
Mastered at Earthsound Studios in Valdosta, GA
Design and Layout by Jerrod Landon Porter at www.iheartjlp.com
Band Photography by Daniel Shippey

References

2008 albums